Darb-e Gonbad is a city in and capital of Darb-e Gonbad District, in Kuhdasht County, Lorestan Province, Iran. At the 2006 census, its population was 2,119, in 451 families.

References

Towns and villages in Kuhdasht County
Cities in Lorestan Province